The Marecchia is a river in eastern Italy. In ancient times it was known as the Ariminus which was from the Greek Aríminos (which is also the ancient name of Rimini). The source of the river is near Monte dei Frati which is east of Pieve Santo Stefano and southwest of Badia Tedalda in the province of Arezzo in Tuscany. It flows northeast into the province of Pesaro and Urbino in the Marche and is the only river that runs through Montefeltro. While flowing through Montefeltro, the river flows through the exclave Santa Sofia Marecchia, which belongs to Badia Tedalda. The river then flows past Sant'Agata Feltria and Novafeltria before crossing into the province of Rimini in Emilia–Romagna. At Torello, part of the commune of San Leo, it flows 1 km west of the Sammarinese territory Acquaviva and the San Marino River flows into it, but the Marecchia does not touch the San Marino border. Finally, the river flows past Verucchio and Santarcangelo di Romagna before flowing into the Adriatic Sea near Rimini.

History
While on his way to fight the Gothic army, the Byzantine general Narses crossed the Marecchia on a pontoon after the leader of the Goths contesting his passage of the river was killed in a skirmish. The mouth of the Marecchia is also the legendary site where Anthony of Padua allegedly preached to the fish.

References

Adriatic Italian coast basins
Rivers of the Province of Arezzo
Rivers of the Province of Pesaro and Urbino
Rivers of the Province of Rimini
Rivers of Italy